Victoria Airport may refer to:

 Victoria International Airport, British Columbia, Canada (IATA: YYJ, ICAO: CYYJ)
 Victoria Airport (Chile) (IATA: ZIC, ICAO: SCTO)
 Victoria Airport (Honduras) (IATA: none, ICAO: none, FAA LID: VTA)
 Victoria Regional Airport, Victoria, Texas, United States (IATA: VCT, ICAO: KVCT, FAA LID: VCT)

See also
 List of airports in Greater Victoria
 List of airports in Victoria, Australia